Johan Jonsson (born 21 July 1985) is a Swedish professional ice hockey defenceman. He is currently playing with Södertälje SK of the Swedish HockeyAllsvenskan (Swe-1).

References

External links
 

1985 births
Living people
Swedish ice hockey defencemen
Växjö Lakers players
Sportspeople from Västerås